Abdelfattah Boussetta  born January 25, 1947, is a Tunisian sculptor and painter (Visual artist). He participated in many international exhibitions, he realized many monuments in Tunisia including the National Monument of the Kasbah in Tunis.

References 
This article incorporates some text translated from Arabic Wikipedia

External links 

1947 births
Tunisian sculptors
Tunisian painters
Tunis Institute of Fine Arts alumni
Living people